The New Zealand national cricket team toured Australia in the 1997-98 season and played three Test matches against Australia.  Australia won the series 2-0 with one match drawn.

Test series summary

1st Test

2nd Test

3rd Test

References

Sources
 Playfair Cricket Annual
 Wisden Cricketers Almanack 
 CricketArchive

1997 in Australian cricket
1997 in New Zealand cricket
1997–98 Australian cricket season
1998 in Australian cricket
1998 in New Zealand cricket
International cricket competitions from 1997–98 to 2000
1997-98